The 1980–81 NBA season was the Warriors 35th season in the NBA and their 18th season in the San Francisco Bay Area.

NBA Draft

Roster

Regular season
The Warriors got off to a 12-6 start thanks to their talented cast of rookies and veterans. Late in the season, they were still in a playoff hunt with a 36-34 record before losing 7 of the next 9 games as the Houston Rockets and the Kansas City Kings got red hot and passed the Warriors and advanced to the playoffs.

Notes
 z, y – division champions
 x – clinched playoff spot

Record vs. opponents

Game log

Player statistics

Season

Awards and records
 Larry Smith, NBA All-Rookie Team 1st Team
 Joe Barry Carroll, NBA All-Rookie Team 1st Team

Transactions

References

See also
 1980-81 NBA season

Golden State Warriors seasons
G
Golden
Golden